Henry of Normandy may refer to:

Henry I of England (died 1135), also Henry I, Duke of Normandy
Henry II of England, (died 1189), also Henry II, Duke of Normandy
Henry, spurious son of Robert Curthose, Duke of Normandy (died 1134)